Marie Proksch (1836 – 17 May 1900) was a Bohemian pianist, music educator and composer.

Biography
Marie Proksch was the daughter of blind pianist Josef Proksch (1794–1864) who also taught music to Bedřich Smetana. Proksch was born in Prague, where she studied music under her father. She went on a concert tour in 1856/57, which included a several-month stay in Paris, and became known as a concert pianist. After the death of her father in 1864, she took control with her brother Theodore Proksch of her father's Musikbildungsanstalt Institute (a music school founded in 1830) in Prague. After her brother died in 1876, she began composing pieces for piano.

References

Further reading
Biographical Yearbook and Deaths in German, ed. Anton Bettelheim, Volume 5, Reimer, Berlin 1903

1836 births
1900 deaths
20th-century classical composers
Czech classical composers
Czech music educators
Women classical composers
19th-century classical composers
Women music educators
19th-century women composers
Musicians from Prague
German Bohemian people